Cham Shalan (also Romanized as Cham Shālān and Cham-e Shalān) is a village in Murmuri Rural District, Kalat District, Abdanan County, Ilam Province, Iran. At the 2006 census, its population was 71, in 9 families. The village is populated by Lurs.

References 

Populated places in Abdanan County
Luri settlements in Ilam Province